Matteo Mancosu (born 22 December 1984) is an Italian footballer who plays as a forward. A right-footed player, although he is usually deployed in the centre as a main striker, he is also capable of playing as a winger on either flank.

Club career

Atletico Elmas and Atletico Calcio
Born in Cagliari, Sardinia, Mancosu played in the youth team of the Scuola Calcio Johannes of Cagliari, and while he was not able to pass any of several trials with Cagliari, the main Sardinian football team, he managed to break into the squad of the Atletico Elmas in Serie D. Mancosu played 4 seasons in Serie D with Atletico Elmas, which was renamed Atletico Calcio in 2002, scoring 7 goals in 73 matches.

Nuorese
Mancosu moved down in Eccellenza in November 2004, to play with Nuorese. In his first year, he contributed to the promotion of the Sardinian club scoring 14 goals in 31 matches. He also played for Nuorese in Serie D the next season, scoring 6 goals in 23 matches.

Villacidrese
Mancosu moved to another Sardinian team in 2006. He will play the next 4 seasons for Villacidrese. In his first 3 seasons there, in 91 matches in Serie D Mancosu scored 43 goals, 18 of whose while leading them to promotion in 2008–2009. Mancosu played the fourth and final season for Villacidrese in Seconda Divisione, scoring 7 goals in 22 matches.

Latina
Mancosu moved to his first team outside Sardinia only in 2010–2011, at the age of 25. He played for one season for Latina in Seconda Divisione, scoring just 5 goals in 20 matches.

Vigor Lamezia
Mancosu moved then to Vigor Lamezia in 2011–2012. He played for the Calabrian side only that season, in Seconda Divisione, and he went to score 20 goals in 37 matches, a career best.

Trapani
Mancosu finally got the chance to debut in Prima Divisione when he joined Trapani in the summer of 2012. Specifically selected to improve a squad that had been very close to the promotion the previous year, Mancosu lead the Sicilian side to a historic first promotion in Serie B scoring 15 times in 29 matches.
Mancosu has been leading the forward line of Trapani also during the 2013–14 Serie B season, scoring 19 goals in the first 27 matches, a record for a rookie. He finished the season as the top-scorer in Serie B with 26 goals in 40 appearances.

Bologna
On 26 January 2015, Mancosu was acquired by Bologna for €1.1 million in a -year contract. On 22 August 2015, he made his Serie A debut on the opening fixture of the 2015–16 Serie A season, a 2–1 defeat against Lazio at the age of 30, scoring his first goal in Serie A in the same match.

Loans to Carpi
On 12 January 2016, he was loaned out by Bologna to Carpi. Carpi also had a buy option and an obligation to purchase his contract outright if Carpi was not relegated. He scored his first goal for the team on his club debut, on 13 January, in a 2–1 away defeat to Milan in the quarter-finals of the Coppa Italia. At the end of season Mancosu returned to Bologna, as the conditional obligation was not achieved nor the option was activated.

Montreal Impact
On 7 July 2016, Mancosu was sent on loan once again, to Canadian side Montreal Impact in Major League Soccer on a one-year loan. The club was also owned by Joey Saputo, chairman of Bologna. Mancosu made his debut for the club coming on as a substitute in a 3–1 home defeat to New York City F.C. on 17 July.

On 2 March 2017, it was announced that Mancosu had signed a two-year deal with Montreal Impact.

Virtus Entella
Mancosu joined Virtus Entella of the Italian Serie C on 8 January 2019.

Personal life
Mancosu has two younger brothers, Marco and Marcello, who are also footballers.

Honours
Individual
Serie B Top-scorer: 2013–14

References

External links

Profile at AIC  
Profile at LegaSerieA.it

1984 births
Living people
Sportspeople from Cagliari
Italian footballers
Italian expatriate footballers
Association football forwards
Trapani Calcio players
Nuorese Calcio players
S.S. Villacidrese Calcio players
Latina Calcio 1932 players
Vigor Lamezia players
Bologna F.C. 1909 players
A.C. Carpi players
CF Montréal players
Virtus Entella players
Serie A players
Serie B players
Serie C players
Major League Soccer players
Expatriate soccer players in Canada
Footballers from Sardinia